Buffalo County is a county located in the U.S. state of Nebraska in the Midwestern United States. As of the 2010 United States Census, the population was 46,102, making it Nebraska's fifth-most populous of the 93 counties. Its county seat is Kearney. The county was created in 1855 and was organized in 1870. It was named after the once-prevalent buffalo herds of the Great Plains.

Buffalo County is part of the Kearney Micropolitan Statistical Area.

In the Nebraska license plate system, Buffalo County is represented by the prefix 9; when the license plate system was established in 1922, the county ranked ninth in number of registered vehicles.

History
The Union Pacific Railroad came to the area in 1866; with additional settlers, the need to establish government was realized. Patrick Walsh, Martin Slattery, and a Sergeant Cody petitioned the governor to organize Buffalo County in 1869.  Wood River Centre (Shelton) was selected through election as county seat. Within a year, the seat was moved to Gibbon. In 1874, voters selected Kearney as the seat.

During the late 19th century and early 20th century, the Watson Ranch, existed in the county. The 8,000 acre ranch extended from the Platte River Valley on the south, to Nebraska's rolling hills on the north, to a point five miles west of downtown Kearney.

Geography

Major highways

  Interstate 80
  U.S. Highway 30
  U.S. Highway 183
  Nebraska Highway 2
  Nebraska Highway 10
  Nebraska Highway 40
  Nebraska Highway 44
  Nebraska Highway 68

Protected area
 Fort Kearny State Historical Park

Adjacent counties

 Hall County – east
 Adams County – southeast
 Kearney County – south
 Phelps County – southwest
 Dawson County – west
 Custer County – northwest
 Sherman County –north
 Howard County – northeast

Demographics

As of the 2000 United States Census, there were 42,259 people, 15,930 households, and 10,227 families in the county. The population density was 44 people per square mile (17/km2). There were 16,830 housing units at an average density of 17 per square mile (7/km2). The racial makeup of the county was 95.18% White, 0.55% Black or African American, 0.33% Native American, 0.68% Asian, 0.03% Pacific Islander, 2.20% from other races, and 1.03% from two or more races. 4.66% of the population were Hispanic or Latino of any race. 42.5% were of German, 8.1% Irish, 7.8% English, 6.8% American and 5.3% Swedish ancestry.

There were 15,930 households, out of which 32.70% had children under the age of 18 living with them, 52.90% were married couples living together, 8.30% had a female householder with no husband present, and 35.80% were non-families. 26.10% of all households were made up of individuals, and 9.60% had someone living alone who was 65 years of age or older. The average household size was 2.48 and the average family size was 3.02.

The county population contained 25.00% under the age of 18, 17.80% from 18 to 24, 26.60% from 25 to 44, 19.00% from 45 to 64, and 11.50% who were 65 years of age or older. The median age was 30 years. For every 100 females, there were 96.00 males. For every 100 females age 18 and over, there were 92.40 males.

The median income for a household in the county was $36,782, and the median income for a family was $46,247. Males had a median income of $30,182 versus $21,977 for females. The per capita income for the county was $17,510. About 6.30% of families and 11.20% of the population were below the poverty line, including 10.50% of those under age 18 and 8.50% of those age 65 or over.

Communities

Cities
 Gibbon
 Kearney (county seat)
 Ravenna

Villages

 Amherst
 Elm Creek
 Miller
 Pleasanton
 Riverdale
 Shelton

Census-designated places
 Glenwood
 Odessa
 Poole

Unincorporated communities

 Buda
 Denman
 Prairie Center
 Saint Michael
 Sartoria
 Sweetwater

Townships

 Armada
 Beaver
 Cedar
 Center
 Cherry Creek
 Collins
 Divide
 Elm Creek
 Gardner
 Garfield
 Gibbon
 Grant
 Harrison
 Logan
 Loup
 Odessa
 Platte
 Riverdale
 Rusco
 Sartoria
 Schneider
 Scott
 Sharon
 Shelton
 Thornton
 Valley

Politics
Buffalo County voters have been strongly Republican for decades. Only seven Democratic Party presidential candidates have won the county from 1880 to the present day, the most recent of which being Lyndon B. Johnson in 1964.

See also
 National Register of Historic Places listings in Buffalo County, Nebraska

References

External links
 

 
Nebraska counties
Kearney Micropolitan Statistical Area
1870 establishments in Nebraska
Populated places established in 1870